Porto Trombetas Airport  is the airport serving the district of Porto Trombetas in Oriximiná, Brazil.

It is operated by the mining company Mineração Rio do Norte S/A.

Airlines and destinations

Access

See also

List of airports in Brazil

References

External links

Airports in Pará